Soron Shookarakshetra is a town in the Indian state of Uttar Pradesh.

History 
Kasganj district was formed on 17 April 2008 by splitting Kasganj, Patiali and Sahawar Tehsils from Etah district. Sant Tulsidas was born in the district and Amir Khusro belongs to Patiali tehsil of the district.

Geography
It is approximately equidistant from Agra, Khair, Aligarh, Bareilly & Mathura.

Demographics
 India census, Soron shookarakshetra had a population of 26,722 of which 14,313 (54%) were males while 12,409 (46%) were females. Soron has an average literacy rate of 49%, lower than the national average of 59.5%: male literacy is 57%, and female literacy is 41%. In Soron Shookarakshetra, 17% of the population is 0–6 years of age.

Temples
Many temples are situated there. Pilgrims gather on each Amavasya, Somvati Amavasya, Tulsi Jayanti, Deepawali, Sharad-Poornima, Margasheersh Mela, Makar Sankranti and Ramanavami are special occasions for such gatherings.

An ancient Varah Mandir with a  brass bell is there. An ancient temple Sitaramji Mandir have stone sculptures pillars. The temple is taken care of by Archeological Survey of India. This temple was partly destroyed by Aurangzeb during his invasion.

Soron Shookarakshetra is believed to be the birthplace of Indian poet Tulsi Das who composed Ramcharitmanas.

Fairs 
In October and November, Soron Shookarakshetra hosts an animal fair. All types of animals are traded. Horses and camels are auctioned. It lasts for up to a month. In December, Soron Shookarakshetra hosts a fair named Margashirsh Mokshda Ekadashi mela. During the fair people take baths in the holy Hari Ki Paudi.

See also
 Government Polytechnic, Soron (Kasganj)

References

Cities and towns in Kasganj district